The Gotham Independent Film Award for Best Ensemble Cast was one of the annual Gotham Independent Film Awards awarded between 2005 and 2012. The award was called Gotham Independent Film Award for Best Ensemble Performance between 2008 and 2012.

Since 2014, a similar award has been given as a special non-competitive award every year, except in 2019. From 2014 to 2018 it was presented as Special Jury Award – Best Ensemble Performance, since 2020 it has been presented as Ensemble Tribute.

Winners and nominees

2000s

2010s

Special non-competitive awards

2010s

2020s

Multiple competitive awards

2 awards
 Philip Seymour Hoffman

Multiple competitive nominations
3 nominations
 Philip Seymour Hoffman

2 nominations
 Kathy Baker
 Bob Balaban
 Jack Black
 Don Cheadle
 George Clooney
 Jeff Daniels
 Rosemarie DeWitt
 Mark Duplass
 Jesse Eisenberg
 William Fichtner
 Rebecca Hall
 LisaGay Hamilton
 Anne Hathaway
 John Hawkes
 Ciarán Hinds
 Catherine Keener
 Jennifer Lawrence
 Jennifer Jason Leigh
 Laura Linney
 Michael Shannon
 David Strathairn
 Emily Watson
 Michelle Williams

See also
 Screen Actors Guild Award for Outstanding Performance by a Cast in a Motion Picture
 Satellite Award for Best Cast – Motion Picture
 Robert Altman Award

References

Best Ensemble Cast
Film awards for Best Cast
Awards established in 2008
Awards disestablished in 2012
Awards established in 2014